In chemical thermodynamics, the reaction quotient (Qr or just Q) is a dimensionless quantity that provides a measurement of the relative amounts of products and reactants present in a reaction mixture for a reaction with well-defined overall stoichiometry, at a particular point in time.  Mathematically, it is defined as the ratio of the activities (or molar concentrations) of the product species over those of the reactant species involved in the chemical reaction, taking stoichiometric coefficients of the reaction into account as exponents of the concentrations. In equilibrium, the reaction quotient is constant over time and is equal to the equilibrium constant.

A general chemical reaction in which α moles of a reactant A and β moles of a reactant B react to give ρ moles of a product R and σ moles of a product S can be written as 
\it \alpha\,\rm A{} + \it \beta\,\rm B{}  <=> \it \rho\,\rm R{} + \it \sigma\,\rm S{}.

The reaction is written as an equilibrium even though in many cases it may appear that all of the reactants on one side have been converted to the other side. When any initial mixture of A, B, R, and S is made, and the reaction is allowed to proceed (either in the forward or reverse direction), the reaction quotient Qr, as a function of time t, is defined as

where {X}t denotes the instantaneous activity of a species X at time t. 
A compact general definition is

where Пj denotes the product across all j-indexed variables, aj(t) is the activity of species j at time t, and νj is the stoichiometric number (the stoichiometric coefficient multiplied by +1 for products and –1 for starting materials).

Relationship to K (the equilibrium constant) 
As the reaction proceeds with the passage of time, the species' activities, and hence the reaction quotient, change in a way that reduces the free energy of the chemical system.  The direction of the change is governed by the Gibbs free energy of reaction by the relation
,
where K is a constant independent of initial composition, known as the equilibrium constant.  The reaction proceeds in the forward direction (towards larger values of Qr) when ΔrG < 0 or in the reverse direction (towards smaller values of Qr) when ΔrG > 0.  Eventually, as the reaction mixture reaches chemical equilibrium, the activities of the components (and thus the reaction quotient) approach constant values.  The equilibrium constant is defined to be the asymptotic value approached by the reaction quotient: 

The timescale of this process depends on the rate constants of the forward and reverse reactions.  In principle, equilibrium is approached asymptotically at t → ∞; in practice, equilibrium is considered to be reached, in a practical sense, when concentrations of the equilibrating species no longer change perceptibly with respect to the analytical instruments and methods used.

If a reaction mixture is initialized with all components having an activity of unity, that is, in their standard states, then

This quantity, ΔrG°, is called the standard Gibbs free energy of reaction.

All reactions, regardless of how favorable, are equilibrium processes, though practically speaking, if no starting material is detected after a certain point by a particular analytical technique in question, the reaction is said to go to completion.

Example 

The burning of octane, C8H18 + 25/2 O2 → 8CO2 + 9H2O has a ΔrG° ~ –240 kcal/mol, corresponding to an equilibrium constant of 10175, a number so large that it is of no practical significance, since there are only ~5 × 1024 molecules in a kilogram of octane.

References

External links
Reaction quotient tutorials 
 tutorial I
 tutorial II
 tutorial III

Equilibrium chemistry
Physical chemistry